Gary Klein (born February 5, 1944, in New York City, New York, U.S.) is a research psychologist famous for pioneering in the field of naturalistic decision making. By studying experts such as firefighters in their natural environment, he discovered that laboratory models of decision making could not describe  it under uncertainty. His recognition primed decision (RPD) model has influenced changes in the ways the Marines and Army train their officers to make decisions.

Klein received his B.A. in psychology from City College of New York (1964) and his Ph.D. in Experimental Psychology from the University of Pittsburgh (1969).  He listed his main influences as Hubert Dreyfus, Adriaan de Groot, and Karl Duncker in an October 2013 interview with Bob Morris.

Since 2009, Klein has been a Senior Scientist at MacroCognition LLC.

He spent the first phase of his career in academia as an assistant professor of psychology at Oakland University (1970–1974).  He also spent a few years as associate professor of psychology at Wilberforce University in Ohio.

The second phase was spent working for the government as a research psychologist for the U.S. Air Force (1974–1978). The Arab oil embargo of 1973 meant that pilots needed to do more of their training in simulators, and Klein began his investigations into the way people develop expertise.

The third phase began in 1978 when he founded his own R&D company, Klein Associates, to study a range of topics that are now described as the Naturalistic Decision Making framework. Klein Associates grew to 37 people by the time he sold it to Applied Research Associates (ARA) in 2005.

During this third phase, Dr. Klein developed a Recognition-Primed Decision (RPD) model in 1985 to describe how people actually make decisions in natural settings. This research was subsequently incorporated in Army doctrine for command and control.  He presented a PreMortem method of risk assessment in 1998.   In 2007, he developed a naturalistic model of sensemaking, the Data/Frame model. In 2009, he presented a Management by Discovery account of how people plan when faced with ill-defined goals.  He described a multi-path model of insight in 2011.  He has led teams that developed several methods of cognitive task analysis for uncovering the tacit knowledge that goes into decision making and for studying cognition in complex settings, including the Critical Decision Method and the Knowledge Audit.  He was one of the leaders of a team that redesigned the White House Situation Room.

In 2015, Gary founded ShadowBox LLC, a cognitive skills training company. The ShadowBox Training Method originated from a Master's thesis in 2008, conducted by now-retired fire battalion chief, Neil Hintze. Gary and Neil worked together to refine this method for training cognitive skill development. The goal of the ShadowBox method is to provide a flexible, scenario-based training technique, that allows trainees to see the world through the eyes of experts — without the experts having to be present. Klein and others report that ShadowBox training has been employed in the military, law enforcement, healthcare, social services, and petrochemical domains.

He is a Fellow of both the American Psychological Association and the Human Factors and Ergonomics Society. In 2008, he received the Jack A. Kraft Innovator Award from the Human Factors and Ergonomics Society.

Publications
 Books
 Sources of Power: How People Make Decisions. Cambridge, MA: MIT Press 1999 
 The Power of Intuition: How to Use Your Gut Feelings to Make Better Decisions at Work. Currency, 2004 
 Streetlights and Shadows: Searching for the Keys to Adaptive Decision Making. Cambridge, MA: MIT Press 2009 
 Working Minds: A Practitioner's Guide to Cognitive Task Analysis. Cambridge, MA: A Bradford Book 2006 
 Seeing What Others Don't: The Remarkable Ways We Gain Insights. New York, NY: Public Affairs 2013 
 Ed. (with Judith Orasanu, and Roberta Calderwood) Decision Making in Action: Models and Methods Ablex, 1993 
 Ed. (with Eduardo Salas) Linking Expertise and Naturalistic Decision Making Erlbaum, 2001 
 Ed. (with Caroline Zsambok) Naturalistic Decision Making Erlbaum, 1996 
Selected articles in refereed journals
with Roberta Calderwood and Beth W. Crandall Time Pressure, Skill, and Move Quality in Chess The American Journal of Psychology, Vol. 101, No. 4 (Winter, 1988), 481–493
with Calderwood, R. and MacGregor, D. Critical decision method for eliciting knowledge Systems, Man and Cybernetics, IEEE Transactions on May/Jun 1989 Vol. 19, 3, 462–472
with Karen J. Peio Use of a Prediction Paradigm to Evaluate Proficient Decision Making The American Journal of Psychology, Vol. 102, No. 3 (Autumn, 1989), pp. 321–331
Klein, G., & Jarosz, A. (2011).  A naturalistic study of insight.  Journal of Cognitive Engineering and Decision Making, 5, 335–351.
Klein, G. (2011).  Critical thoughts about critical thinking.  Theoretical Issues in Ergonomics Science, 12:3, 210–224.
Klein, G., Calderwood, R., & Clinton-Cirocco, A. (2010).  Rapid decision making on the fire ground: The original study plus a postscript.  Journal of **Cognitive Engineering and Decision Making, 4, 186–209.  
Kahneman, D., & Klein, G. (2009).  Conditions for intuitive expertise: A failure to disagree.  American Psychologist, 64, 515–526.
Klein, G. (2008). Naturalistic decision making.  Human Factors, 50 (3), 456–460.
Klein, G. (2007). Performing a project PreMortem.  Harvard Business Review, September, 18–19.
Klein, G., Phillips, J. K., Rall, E., & Peluso, D. A. (2007). A data/frame theory of sensemaking, In R. R. Hoffman (Ed.) Expertise out of Context. Erlbaum: **Mahweh, NJ
Klein, G., Pliske, R. M., Crandall, B., & Woods, D. (2005). Problem detection. Cognition, Technology, and Work, 7, 14–28.
Klein, G., Ross, K. G., Moon, B. M., Klein, D. E., Hoffman, R. R., & Hollnagel, E. (2003). Macrocognition. IEEE Intelligent Systems, 18(3), 81–85.
Lipshitz, R., Klein, G., Orasanu, J., & Salas, E. (2001). Focus article: Taking stock of naturalistic decision making. Journal of Behavioral Decision Making, 14, 331–352.
Klein, G., & Weick, K. (June 2000). Making better decisions. Across the Board, 37(6), 16–22.
Klinger, D. W., & Klein, G. (1999). Emergency response organizations: An accident waiting to happen. Ergonomics in Design, 7(3), 20–25.

References

External links
 Gary Klein's blog on insight
 Gary Klein's blog on Psychology Today
 Website of Macrocognition LLC
 ASK Talks with Dr. Gary Klein. NASA ASK Issue 20 undated
 Seeing through Expert Eyes: Ace decision makers may perceive distinctive worlds Science News Vol. 154, No. 3, July 18, 1998, p. 44
 Decision researchers split, but prolific APA Monitor Vol. 30, No. 5, May 1999
 What's Your Intuition ? Fast Company August, 2000
 Bruce Bower, Reworking Intuition: Business simulations spark rapid workplace renovations Science Week Oct. 23, 2004; Vol. 166, No. 17, p. 263
 Daniel D. Frey and Kemper Lewis The Deciding Factor: Design engineers make decisions for a living: Research looks for ways to make the process go smoother. Mechanical Engineering Design March 2005
 Brown, Paul B. What's Offline: Analyzing Failure Beforehand New York Times September 22, 2007
 MacroCognition, About Us: Gary Klein, Ph.D 2011
 Noblis, Profile: Gary Klein, Ph.D.
 Human Factors and Ergonomics Society Fellow Profile 
 The Recognition Primed Decision Model, An Alternative to the MDMP for GWOT
 Naturalistic Decision Making, Human Factors 
 ShadowBox, LLC Website

1944 births
Living people
21st-century American psychologists
People from Yellow Springs, Ohio
People from Fairborn, Ohio
City College of New York alumni
University of Pittsburgh alumni
Oakland University faculty
Wilberforce University faculty
20th-century American Jews
21st-century American Jews
20th-century American psychologists